Bhog (n. 'pleasure' or 'delight', v. 'to end' or 'to conclude') is a term used in Hinduism and Sikhism. In Sikhism, it is used for observances that are fulfilled along with the reading of the concluding part of the Guru Granth Sahib. It can be performed in conjunction with weddings, obsequies, anniversaries, funeral services and other occasions when a family or a worshipping community may consider such a reading appropriate.

In Hinduism
Bhog in the Hindu religion is food given to the Gods.

In Sikhism
The term Bhog is used in the Sikh religion for observances that are fulfilled along with the reading of the concluding part of the Sri Guru Granth Sahib Ji. The reading of this holy scripture is done on a day-to-day basis with a staff of readers at a major worship centre. The community generally relates 'Bhog' to an uninterrupted and complete reading of their holy book (Sri Guru Granth Sahib Ji). This usually takes days to complete through a relay of readers who work round-the-clock. This is also called the Akhand Path. This type of path and hence the 'Bhog' as it comes to its end, can be performed in conjunction with weddings, obsequies, anniversaries and other occasions, when a family or a worship community might consider such reading to be appropriate.

Bhog also takes place when a family or a community decides to go for a slower reading of the holy scripture (Sahaj Path). The reading is done as and when circumstances permit. The 'Bhog' comes at its end and has to be recited in a single session, without a break. Another variation is the Saptahik Path, in which the reading of the scripture has to be completed within a week. The Sahaj Path may continue for months.

'Bhog' is a derivative from the Sanskrit word "Bhoga" and as a verb it means 'to end' or 'to conclude'. It is generally used to denote a funeral service. The Karah Prasad that is distributed at the end of any congregational service might also be termed 'Bhog'. An occasion of joy or sorrow, prompt a Sikh householder to follow the path of the Guru Granth Sahib Ji, preferred by himself or his family. If this is not possible, then Pathis or scripture-readers are invited for this purpose. The assignation of the time period is often announced at a local Gurudwara during the Sangat. Notices might be placed in the newspapers.

In the case of Saptahik Paths, the reader reads the entire Holy Book except for the last five pages. This is when the Karah Prasad is prepared. The unread portion is continued after the 'inaugural hymns'. The Pathi would start slowly and would read Guru Teg Bahadur's 57 couplets, Mundavani and a Sloka (or a hymn) by Guru Arjan. The Ragamala follows this.

The Mundavani is an essential part and is like a seal to the scripture. It reiterates the essentials of the teachings of the book - Sat(ya) (the truth), santokh (contentment), vichar (wisdom) and the remembrance to the Holy name (Nam).

The Ardas is read after the reading is completed. Ardas has its own powerful associations brought into bhog. These include recalling the glorious past of the Sikhs: their heroism, devotion, martyrdom and marking the present Khalsa.

After the Ardas, the Hukam or command for the day is obtained by reading out the hymn offered by the text which is naturally interpreted in the context of the intention of the path, that is, as the word of the Guru to those receiving it at that point, with their purposes particularly in mind, be it a family event, a funeral, a wedding, or invocation for blessing on a new venture.

In West Bengal

In West Bengal and neighboring regions, Bhog is commonly distributed in major festivals like the Durga Puja, Kali Puja, Saraswati Puja and other community poojas. It is commonly served in large temple complexes. The bhog is a blessed food that doubles up as a complete meal as opposed to prasad, which in West Bengal, would be in smaller quantity and would not be intended to be a meal. A most common form of bhog is in the form of Khichdi, served with a semi dry vegetable preparation, sweet tomato chutney and payesh (kheer), which is a rice pudding. This is typically served on flat plates of leaves of Sal (tree) joined with small twigs, all of which are then discarded.

See also
 Prasad

References

Puja (Hinduism)
Objects used in Hindu worship
Sikh practices
Sanskrit words and phrases
Hindi words and phrases